The Toledo Crush were a women's indoor football team in the Legends Football League, formerly known as the Lingerie Football League before 2013. The Crush began play for the 2011–12 season as the Cleveland Crush with home games at Quicken Loans Arena in downtown Cleveland, Ohio.

On December 16, 2013, Cleveland Scene reported that the team would relocate to Toledo, Ohio, as the Toledo Crush before the 2014 season. The Crush played their home games at the Huntington Center in downtown Toledo.

On January 27, 2015, the league stated that the Crush would be suspending operations and would relocate to another Ohio market by the 2017 season. The Crush were never revived.

References

External links
 

American football teams in Cleveland
Legends Football League US teams
American football teams established in 2011
American football teams disestablished in 2015
2011 establishments in Ohio
2015 disestablishments in Ohio
Women's sports in Ohio